Ethmia thoraea is a moth in the family Depressariidae. It is found in Australia from the north coast of Queensland to coastal New South Wales, and inland at Cunnamulla in Queensland, and Mount Kaputar in New South Wales.

The forewings are grey with black spots.

The larvae possibly feed on Cynoglossum australe.

References

Moths described in 1910
thoraea